is a 2006 film directed by Japanese director Eiji Okuda.

Cast
 Ken Ogata as Yasutaro Matsuda
 Saki Takaoka as Mayumi Yokoyama
 Hana Sugiura as Sachi
 Shota Matsuda as Wataru
 Tomokazu Ōhashi
 Kiwako Harada
 Sakura Ando
 Masa Yamada
 Midori Kiuchi
 Masahiko Tsugawa 
 Eiji Okuda

External links
 

2006 films
Films directed by Eiji Okuda
2000s Japanese-language films
2000s Japanese films